Corixa affinis is a species of water boatman in the family Corixidae in the order Hemiptera.

References

Further reading
 

Insects described in 1817
Fauna of Ireland
Corixini